General elections were held in Malta on 12 April 2003. The result was a victory for the Nationalist Party, which won 35 of the 65 seats in Parliament.

Results

References

General elections in Malta
Malta
General
Malta